將棋 (Traditional Chinese, Japanese kyūjitai, and Korean Hanja) or 将棋 (Simplified Chinese and Japanese shinjitai) may refer to:

Shogi (Japanese chess)
Janggi (Korean chess; written 장기)
Xiangqi (Chinese chess, usually written 象棋)